Panine gammaherpesvirus 1 (PnHV-1), commonly known as chimpanzee lymphocryptovirus, is a species of virus in the genus Lymphocryptovirus, subfamily Gammaherpesvirinae, family Herpesviridae, and order Herpesvirales.

The virus infects chimpanzee (Pan troglodytes) leukocytes. The glycoprotein B (gB) gene of the chimpanzee Lymphocryptovirus is virtually identical to the corresponding gene in the orangutan lymphocryptovirus. This suggests that the virus may have been transmitted between chimps and orangutans relatively recently (either in the wild or in captivity).

It is 35 to 45% homologous to the human Epstein–Barr virus, which is classified in the same genus.

References

External links
 

Gammaherpesvirinae